is a Japanese voice actress from Kanagawa Prefecture, Japan. She is currently affiliated with Aksent.

Filmography

Animation
 Agent Aika as White Delmo R
 Animal Yokocho as Issa
 Astro Boy as Kenichi
 Black Jack as Sharaku
 Crayon Shin-chan: Ankoku Tamatama Daitsuiseki as Hostage
 Crayon Shin-chan: Dengeki! Buta no Hizume Daisakusen as Segi
 Digimon: Data Squad as Young Tohma (ep 15)
 Doraemon Comes Back as Child
 Doraemon: Nobita and the Strange Wind Rider as Tomjin
 Dr. Pinoko no Mori no Bouken as Sharaku
 Eureka Seven as Holland Novak (Teenager)
 Flag as Hakan Akbal
 Fullmetal Alchemist as Lust
 Gad Guard as Takumi Kisaragi
 Gegege no Kitaro as Yuki-onna (ep 7)
 Gintama as Oryou
 Gun X Sword as Lin (ep 8)
 InuYasha (Ep 166–7)
 Kaleido Star as Julia
 Mobile Suit Gundam Seed as Juri Wu Nien
 Mobile Suit Gundam SEED: Special Edition as Muruta Azrael (Young)
 Naruto as Akane
 Oh! Edo Rocket as Genzou Mama
 Rumiko Takahashi Anthology as female subordinate (ep 9); housewife (ep 1)
 Saiyuki Reload as Kami (child) (ep. 22, 24)
 SD Gundam Force as Gundamusai; Raimi
 Shaman King as Yoh Asakura (2001 anime)
 The SoulTaker as Sanae
 The World of Narue as Rokugo (ep 3)
 Yu-Gi-Oh! 5D's as Michel (ep 70)

Japanese dubbing roles
Fringe, Astrid Farnsworth (Jasika Nicole)
Identity, Ginny Virginia (Clea DuVall)
Smokin' Aces, Georgia Sykes (Alicia Keys)

References

External links
  
 

Living people
Japanese video game actresses
Japanese voice actresses
Voice actresses from Kanagawa Prefecture
Year of birth missing (living people)